Glen Young was a professional American football player who played wide receiver for five seasons for the Philadelphia Eagles and Cleveland Browns. Glen now teaches sports related and coaching classes at Mississippi State University where he was a standout kick returner.  He was inducted into the Mississippi State University Hall of Fame in 2009.

See also
 List of NCAA major college yearly punt and kickoff return leaders

References

1960 births
American football wide receivers
American football return specialists
Philadelphia Eagles players
Cleveland Browns players
Mississippi State Bulldogs football players
Living people